Old Friend: The Deluxe Collection 1976-1998 is a posthumous compilation album by singer Phyllis Hyman, released in 2021. The box set contains 9 CDs, featuring all of her studio albums as well as bonus material recorded over the course of her career.

Reception
In a review for AllMusic, Andy Kellman described the box set as a "proper testament to Hyman's excellence" and noted the "obvious love and care" that went into its assembly. The box set was given 4 and a half stars out of 5.

AllMusic also named the box set as one of its favourite archival releases of 2021.

Track listing
Asterisks (*) denote bonus tracks. Tracklist taken from SoulMusic press release .

Disc 1 – Phyllis Hyman (1977) (with 6 bonus tracks)
"Loving You, Losing You" (Thom Bell) - 7:26
"No One Can Love You More" (Skip Scarborough) - 4:20
"One Thing on My Mind" (Evie Sands/Richard Germinaro) - 5:28
"I Don't Want to Lose You" (Thom Bell/Linda Creed) - 5:29
"Deliver the Love" (Onaje Allan Gumbs/Ausar Sahw Rachim) - 3:57
"Was Yesterday Such a Long Time Ago" (M. Goode/Buddy Scott) - 4:34
"Night Bird Gets the Love" (Muhyi Shakoor/Clifford Carter) - 5:20
"Beautiful Man of Mine" (Larry Alexander) - 6:56
"Children of the World" (Hubert Eaves III) - 2:57
"Baby (I'm Gonna Love You)" (Larry Alexander) - 3:49*
 Standalone 1976 single
"Do Me" (Hiram Bullock/Larry Alexander) [7" version] - 3:00*
 B-side of "(Baby I'm Gonna Love You)"
"You're the One" (John E. Davis) - 5:22*
 From "You Know How to Love Me" 2002 CD reissue and "Can't We Fall in Love Again?" 2008 CD reissue"We Need Each Other" (Michael Henderson) - 4:00*
 Norman Connors featuring Phyllis Hyman and Michael Henderson
"Betcha By Golly Wow" (Thom Bell/Linda Creed) - 6:17*
 Norman Connors featuring Phyllis Hyman
"Just Imagine" (Onaje Allan Gumbs) - 3:58*
 Norman Connors featuring Phyllis Hyman
 Tracks 13-15 from the 1976 Norman Connors studio album "You Are My Starship"

Disc 2 – Somewhere in My Lifetime (1978) (with 6 bonus tracks)
"Kiss You All Over" (Mike Chapman/Nicky Chinn) - 5:14
"Somewhere in My Lifetime" (Jesus Alvarez) - 3:30
"Lookin' for a Lovin'" (Phyllis Brown/Barry Goldberg) - 2:58
"The Answer Is You" (Mark Radice) - 5:09
"So Strange" (Theodore Life, Billy Green) - 4:40
"Gonna Make Changes" (Phyllis Hyman) - 3:58
"Living Inside Your Love" (Skip Scarborough/Renee Taylor) - 6:14
"Be Careful (How You Treat My Love)" (Garry Glenn) - 4:12
"Soon Come Again" (Larry Alexander/Sandy Torano) - 3:36
"Here's That Rainy Day" (Jimmy Van Heusen/Johnny Burke) - 3:02
 Tracks 4, 6-10 previously issued on 1978's "Sing a Song"
"So Strange" [12" version] - 8:59*
 A-side of "So Strange" US 12" promo
"Kiss You All Over" [12" version] - 6:14*
 B-side of "So Strange" US 12" promo and "Under Your Spell" UK 12" single
"Sweet Music" (Al Martinez) - 3:46*
"Love is Free" (Mark Radice) - 3:43*
"Sing a Song" (Philip Bailey/Ernest Straughter) - 3:35*
 Tracks 13-15 previously issued on 1978's "Sing a Song" but did not appear on "Somewhere in My Lifetime"
"As You Are" (Norman Connors/Paul Smith) - 5:09*
 Pharoah Sanders featuring Phyllis Hyman
 Track 16 from the 1978 Pharoah Sanders album "Love Will Find a Way"

Disc 3 – You Know How to Love Me (1979) (with 7 bonus tracks)
"You Know How to Love Me" (Reggie Lucas/James Mtume) - 7:37
"Some Way" (Reggie Lucas/James Mtume) - 5:13
"Under Your Spell" (Reggie Lucas/James Mtume) - 4:40
"This Feeling Must Be Love" (William Beard) - 3:48
"But I Love You" (Misha Segal/Morgan Ames) - 3:07
"Heavenly" (Reggie Lucas/James Mtume) - 4:33
"Hold On" (Hubert Eaves III/Tawatha Agee) - 4:15
"Give a Little More" (Howard Schneider/Larry Alexander/Phyllis Hyman) - 4:07
"Complete Me" (Brad Catron) - 5:26
"You Know How to Love Me" [Single Edit] - 3:45*
"Under Your Spell" [Single Edit] - 3:35*
"Magic Mona" (Thom Bell/Leroy Bell/Casey James/Jack Robinson) - 3:22*
 From the 1979 Motion Picture Soundtrack "The Fish That Saved Pittsburgh"
"I'll Be Around" (Stanley Clarke/McCoy Tyner) - 6:10*
 McCoy Tyner featuring Phyllis Hyman
"Love Surrounds Us Everywhere" (McCoy Tyner) - 5:12*
 McCoy Tyner featuring Phyllis Hyman
"In Search of My Heart" (McCoy Tyner) - 7:04*
 McCoy Tyner featuring Phyllis Hyman
 Tracks 13-15 from the 1982 McCoy Tyner album "Looking Out"
"In a Sentimental Mood" (Irving Mills/Manny Kurtz) - 3:25*
 Track 16 from the 1981 soundtrack for "Duke Ellington's Sophisticated Ladies"

Disc 4 – Can't We Fall in Love Again? (1981) (with 6 bonus tracks)
"You Sure Look Good to Me" (Brian Potter/Rick Conedera) - 4:20
"Don't Tell Me, Tell Her" (Doug James/Sandy Linzer) - 4:18
"I Ain't Asking" (Nickolas Ashford/Valerie Simpson) - 4:02
"Can't We Fall in Love Again?" (John Lewis Parker/Peter Ivers) - 5:17
 Duet with Michael Henderson
"The Love Too Good To Last" (Burt Bacharach/Carole Bayer Sager/Peter Allen) – 4:06
"Tonight You and Me" (Bruce Hawes/Peyton Scott) - 3:45
"Sunshine in My Life" (Larry Alexander/Phyllis Hyman) - 4:27
"Just Another Face in the Crowd" (Dennis Caldirola/Joe Ericksen) - 5:52
"Can't We Fall in Love Again?" [Single version] - 4:37*
"You Sure Look Good to Me" [Single version] - 3:26*
"Tonight You and Me" [Disco version] - 5:22*
 A-side of "Tonight You and Me" 12" single
"Sleep on It" (Andrew Kastner/Larry McNally) - 3:19*
"If You Ever Change Your Mind" (David Batteau/Richard Calhoun/Scott Shelley) - 2:56*
"In Between Heartaches" (Burt Bacharach/Hal David) - 3:44*
 Tracks 12-14 from the 2003 compilation "In Between the Heartaches" and the "Can't We Fall in Love Again?" 2008 CD reissue

Disc 5 – Goddess of Love (1983) (with 3 bonus tracks)
"Riding the Tiger" (Narada Michael Walden/Jeffrey Cohen/Dwayne Simmons) - 6:20
"Goddess of Love" (Narada Michael Walden/Jeffrey Cohen/David Sancious) - 5:48
"Why Did You Turn Me On" (Narada Michael Walden/Corrado Rustici/Allee Willis) - 4:09
"You Move, My Heart" (George Merrill/Shannon Rubicam - 4:41
"Let Somebody Love You" (Alan Glass/Preston Glass) - 4:42
"Falling Star" (Bill Neale/George Merrill/Shannon Rubicam) - 3:45
"We Should Be Lovers" (Joseph Jefferson/Charles Simmons/Sherman Marshall) - 3:51
"Just Me and You" (Thom Bell/Joseph Jefferson) - 4:34
"Just 25 Miles to Anywhere" (Thom Bell/Joseph Jefferson) - 2:42
"I'm Not Asking You to Stay" (Joseph Jefferson/Richard Roebuck) - 4:18*
 Track 10 from the "Can't We Fall in Love Again?" 2008 CD reissue
"Riding the Tiger" [Dance version] - 8:44*
 A-side of "Riding the Tiger" 12" single
"Riding the Tiger" [Single edit] - 4:08*

Disc 6 – Living All Alone (1986) (with 2 bonus tracks)
"Living All Alone" (Cynthia Biggs/Kenneth Gamble/Dexter Wansel) - 5:07
"First Time Together" (Cynthia Biggs/Kenneth Gamble/Thom Bell) - 4:01
"If You Want Me" (Reggie Griffin/Junior Giscombe) - 4:18
"Slow Dancin'" (Thom Bell/LeRoy Bell/Casey James) - 4:33
"Old Friend" (Linda Creed) - 4:50
"You Just Don't Know" (Cynthia Biggs/Kenneth Gamble/Thom Bell) - 4:13
"Ain't You Had Enough Love" (Carl McIntosh, Jane Eugene, Steve Nichol) - 4:11
"Screamin' at the Moon" (Wayne Wallace/Ronald Hollins) - 4:08
"What You Won't Do for Love" (Bobby Caldwell/Alfons Kettner) - 4:02
"Black and Blue" - 4:00*
 Barry Manilow and Phyllis Hyman featuring Tom Scott
 Track 10 from the 1987 Barry Manilow album "Swing Street"
"Sacred Kind of Love" - 5:37*
 Grover Washington, Jr. featuring Phyllis Hyman
 Track 11 from the 1989 Grover Washington Jr. album "Time Out of Mind"

Disc 7 – Prime of My Life (1991) (with 2 bonus tracks)
"When You Get Right Down to It" (Nick Martinelli/Reginald Hines) - 4:20
"I Found Love" (Jonathan Rosen/Karen Manno) - 4:24
"Don't Wanna Change the World" (Jonathan Rosen/Karen Manno/David Darlington) - 5:21
"Prime of My Life" (Preston Glass/Alan Glass) - 5:11
"When I Give My Love (This Time)" (Kenneth Gamble/Roland Chambers) - 7:00
"I Can't Take It Anymore" (Nick Martinelli/Reginald Hines) - 4:20
"Walk Away" (Marti Sharron/Kenny Hirsch) - 4:23
"Living in Confusion" (Kenneth Gamble/Terry Burrus/Phyllis Hyman) - 7:05
"Meet Me on the Moon" (Gene McDaniels/Carrie Thompson) - 6:43
"Whatever Happened to Our Love" (Kenneth Gamble/Terry Burrus) - 4:06
"(The) Hottest Love Around" (Doug James/Sue Shifrin) - 4:28*
 Japanese bonus track and B-side of "I Found Love" CD promo single
"Don't Wanna Change the World" [No Rap version] - 4:09*
 B-side of "Don't Wanna Change the World" Cassette single

Disc 8 – I Refuse to Be Lonely (1995)
"I Refuse to Be Lonely" (Jud Friedman/Alan Rich/Nick Martinelli/Phyllis Hyman) - 3:58
"Waiting for the Last Tear to Fall" (Jon Rosen/Karen Manno/Jeff Franzel) - 4:10
"This Too Shall Pass" (Lorrain Feather/Joe Curiale) - 5:26
"I'm Truly Yours" (Kenneth Gamble/James Sigler) - 5:39
"I'm Calling You" (Phyllis Hyman/Kenneth Gamble/Dexter Wansel) - 5:59
"Back to Paradise" (Jon Rosen/Karen Manno/Jim Jacobsen) - 4:48
"It's Not About You (It's About Me)" (Dave Hall/Gordon Chambers/Phyllis Hyman) - 5:14
"It Takes Two" (Noel Cohen/Daryl Hair/Phyllis Hyman) - 4:11
"Why Not Me" (Barry J. Eastmond/Gordon Chambers/Diane Quander/Phyllis Hyman) - 4:40
"Give Me One Good Reason to Stay" (Kenneth Gamble/Leon A. Huff) - 5:13

Disc 9 – Forever with You (1998)
"Forever with You" (Kenneth Gamble/Terry Burruss) - 4:17
"Funny How Love Goes" (Kenneth Gamble/Walter Sigler) - 4:46
"Come Right or Not at All" (Jane Eugene/Nick Martinelli/Ian Prince/Phyllis Hyman/Angelo Morris) - 4:35
"The Strength of a Woman" (Phyllis Hyman/Denise Rich/Sunny Hilden) - 4:22
"Hurry Up This Way Again" (Dexter Wansel/Cynthia Biggs) - 4:20
"How Long" (Michael O'Hara/Phyllis Hyman) - 4:15
"Someone to Love" (Michael Masser) - 4:00
"Tell Me What You're Gonna Do" (Barry Eastmond/Phyllis Hyman/Herb Middleton) - 4:35
"The Kids" (Kenneth Gamble/Bruce A. Hawes) - 4:38
"Set a Little Trap" (James Sigler) - 4:17
"No One But You" (Kenneth Gamble/Leon A. Huff) - 4:31
"Souvenirs" (Preston Glass/Alan Glass/Narada Michael Walden/Walter Afanasieff) - 4:25

Reference

External links
 

Phyllis Hyman albums
2021 compilation albums